The following is a list of winners of the Golden Calf Special Jury Prize at the Nederlands Film Festival.

 2009 The whole team - Can Go Through Skin
 2008 Willem de Beukelaer's Stunt Team (Willem de Beukelaer, Marco Maas, Ronald Schuurbiers)
 2007 Halina Reijn and Fedja van Huêt - De prins en het meisje
 2006 Mercedes Stalenhoef - Ik wil nooit beroemd worden
 2005 The late Theo van Gogh - 06/05, Medea, and his work; and the late Willem van de Sande Bakhuyzen - Lepel, Leef!, and his work
 2004 Albert ter Heerdt and Mimoun Oaïssa - Shouf Shouf Habibi!
 2003 Peter Blok, Pierre Bokma, Gijs Scholten van Aschat, and Jaap Spijkers - Cloaca
 2002 George Sluizer - Het stenen vlot, and all his work
 2001 The whole team - Hertenkamp (TV series)
 2000 Pieter van Huystee - 11 productions
 1999 Ian Kerkhof - Shabondama Elegy
 1998 Sonia Herman Dolz - Lagrimas Negras
 1997 Arjan Ederveen - His work
 1996 Hans Heijnen - De waterwolf van Itteren, Uncle Frank, Strike Out
 1995 Jany Temine - Costumes
 1994 Ariane Schluter - 06
 1993 Peter Delpeut - The Forbidden Quest
 1992 Thom Hoffman - De domeinen Ditvoorst, among his other work
 1991 Pim de la Parra - All his work
 1990 Felix de Rooy and Norman de Palm - Ava & Gabriel
 1989 Anneke Blok - Uw mening graag
 1988 Alejandro Agresti - Love Is a Fat Woman
 1987 Will van Kralingen - Havinck
 1986 Jos Stelling - De Wisselwachter
 1985 Orlow Seunke - Pervola
 1984 Eric de Kuyper - Naughty Boys
 1983 Annette Apon - Giovanni, among her other work

References

External links
 Nederlands Film Festival (Official website)

Special Jury Prize